Starobashirovo (İśke Bäşir) is a rural locality (a selo) in Chekmagushevsky District of the Republic of Bashkortostan, Russia.

References

Notes

Sources

Rural localities in Chekmagushevsky District